The Beylerbeyi Palace (literally meaning the palace of the bey of beys) is located in the Beylerbeyi neighbourhood of Üsküdar district in Istanbul, Turkey, at the Asian side of the Bosphorus. An Imperial Ottoman summer residence built between 1861 and 1865, it is now situated immediately north of the first Bosphorus Bridge. It was the last place where Sultan Abdulhamid II was under house arrest before his death in 1918.

History
Beylerbeyi Palace was commissioned by Sultan Abdülaziz (1830–1876) and built between 1861 and 1865 as a summer residence and a place to entertain visiting heads of state. Empress Eugénie of France visited Beylerbeyi on her way to the opening of the Suez Canal in 1869. Empress Eugénie of France was so delighted by the elegance of the palace that she had a copy of the window in the guest room made for her bedroom in Tuileries Palace, in Paris. 
Naser al-Din Shah Qajar of Iran stayed in the palace while he was in Istanbul, back on his way from Exposition Universelle (1889) of France.
Other regal visitors to the palace included the Duke and Duchess of Windsor.

The palace was the last place of captivity of the deposed sultan Abdulhamid II from 1912 until his death there in 1918.

Description
Designed in the Second Empire style by Sarkis Balyan, Beylerbeyi Palace seems fairly restrained compared to the excesses of the earlier Dolmabahçe or Küçüksu palaces.

The palace looks its most attractive from the Bosphorus, from where its two bathing pavilions, one for the harem (women's only) and the other for the selamlik (men's only), can best be seen. One of the most attractive rooms is the reception hall, which has a pool and fountain. Running water was popular in Ottoman houses for its pleasant sound and cooling effect in the heat.

Egyptian reed matting is used on the floor as a form of insulation. The crystal chandeliers are mostly French Baccarat and the carpets are from Hereke.

See also 
 Beylerbeyi Palace Tunnel
 Ottoman architecture

Literature 
 Hakan Gülsün. Beylerbeyi Palace. TBMM. Istanbul, 1993.

Gallery

External links 

 Directorate of National Palaces | Beylerbeyi Palace

Houses completed in 1865
Sarkis Balyan buildings
Ottoman palaces in Istanbul
Museums in Istanbul
Bosphorus
Baroque Revival architecture in Turkey
Üsküdar
Tourism in Istanbul
Historic house museums in Turkey
1865 establishments in the Ottoman Empire